Uncle Sam's Curse is the third studio album by the American hip hop group Above the Law. It was released in 1994, the group's final record on Ruthless Records. The album peaked at number 15 on the Top R&B/Hip-Hop Albums and 113 on the Billboard 200. Uncle Sam's Curse sold over 250,000 copies.

Audio production was handled by A.T.L.'s Cold 187um with co-producers KM.G and K-oss. The tracks "Return of the Real Shit" and "Black Superman" contain samples from the 1994 film Against the Wall.

Critical reception

Trouser Press wrote that "Cold 187um kicks more good grooves as producer, but he can't smooth over the lyrical nonsense."

In 2016, LA Weekly called the album "an hourlong, funk-driven study in urban injustice and middle-American anxiety released halfway through the summer of the Brentwood murders, Newt Gingrich's Contract With America and the Major League Baseball strike."

Track listing

Personnel

 Gregory Fernan Hutchinson — main artist, producer, keyboards, mixing
 Kevin Michael Gulley — main artist, co-producer
 Anthony Stewart — main artist, co-producer
 Jerry Long, Jr. — featured artist (tracks 3, 6, 11)
 Anthony Terrell Smith — featured artist (track 11)
 Mike Smooth — bass, guitar, keyboards
 Jimmy Russell — bass
 Brian Gardner — mastering
 Mark Paladino — mixing
 Michael Miller — photography
 David Bett — art direction
 Allan Wai — design
 Kurt Nagahori — illustration (cover)
 Joanna — backing vocals
 Nicki — backing vocals

Charts

Weekly charts

Year-end charts

References

1994 albums
Ruthless Records albums
Above the Law (group) albums
Albums produced by Cold 187um